2-Nitrobenzaldehyde is an organic aromatic compound containing a nitro group ortho to formyl. 2-Nitrobenzaldehyde once was produced as an intermediate in the synthesis of the popular dye Indigo.

Synthesis
The main routes to nitrobenzaldehyde begin with the nitration of styrene and cinnamic acid followed by the conversions of the resulting  2-nitrostyrene and 2-nitrocinnamic acids. Cinnamaldehyde can also be nitrated, e.g., in a solution of acetic anhydride in acetic acid, in high-yield to 2-nitrocinnamaldehyde. This compound is then oxidized to 2-nitrocinnamic acid, which is decarboxylated to the 2-nitrostyrene. The vinyl group can be oxidized in a number of different ways to yield 2-nitrobenzaldehyde.

In one synthetic process, toluene is mono-nitrated at cold temperatures to 2-nitrotoluene, with about 58% being converted to the ortho- isomer, the remaining forming meta- and para- isomers. The 2-nitrotoluene can then be oxidized to yield 2-nitrobenzaldehyde.

Alternatively, 2-nitrotoluene as formed above can be halogenated to a 2-nitrobenzyl halide followed by oxidation with DMSO and sodium bicarbonate to yield 2-nitrobenzaldehyde, which is subsequently purified with the creation of a bisulfite adduct.

The nitration of benzaldehyde produces mostly 3-nitrobenzaldehyde, with yields being about 19% for the ortho-, 72% for the meta- and 9% for the para isomer. For this reason, the nitration of benzaldehyde to yield 2-nitrobenzaldehyde is not cost-effective.

Uses
2-Nitrobenzaldehyde is an intermediate in an early route to indigo, a water-insoluble dye commonly used to dye jeans and other fabrics.  In the Baeyer-Drewson indigo synthesis, 2-nitrobenzaldehyde condenses with acetone in basic aqueous solution to yield indigo in a one-pot synthesis.  The method was abandoned in the early part of the 20th century, being replaced by routes from aniline.

Given its two relatively reactive groups, 2-nitrobenzaldehyde is a potential starting material for other compounds.  Substituted 2-nitrobenzaldehydes can also be used to yield other important compounds based on indigo, such as indigo carmine.

2-Nitrobenzaldehyde has been shown to be a useful photoremovable protecting group for various functions.

References

Benzaldehydes
Nitrobenzenes